Vadim Feliksovich Khafizov (born 6 February 1970) is a Russian professional football coach.

Honours
 Russian Professional Football League Zone West Best Manager: 2015–16.

References

External links
 

1970 births
People from Engels, Saratov Oblast
Living people
Russian football managers
FC Gornyak Uchaly managers
FC Khimki managers
FC Sokol Saratov managers
Sportspeople from Saratov Oblast